Frank Newton may refer to:

 Leo Newton (1888–1939), full name Leonard Frank Newton, Welsh international footballer
 Frank Newton (cricketer) (1909-1973), New Zealand cricketer
 Frank Newton (footballer, born 1882) (1882–1959), English footballer
 Frank Newton (forward, born 1902) (1902–?), English footballer
 Frank Newton (defender, born 1902), English footballer
 Frank Newton (racing driver), British racing driver and engineer
 Frankie Newton (1906–1954), jazz trumpeter

See also
 Francis Newton (disambiguation)